MV Jupiter was a Greek-registered cruise ship that sank on 21 October 1988, within 40 minutes of leaving the Greek port of Piraeus. On board were 391 British schoolchildren and 84 adults on a study cruise and 110 crew. The disaster claimed the lives of one pupil, one teacher and two Greek crew members.

The ship
Jupiter was originally known as Moledet ("Fatherland") and was a passenger ship registered in the port of Haifa in 1961. The 7,810-tonne vessel was built for Zim (Israel Navigation Company Ltd) and sailed regular voyages around the Mediterranean. In September 1970, Moledet was sold to Epirotiki Line, a Greek shipping company, and renamed Jupiter.

Sinking of the Jupiter
On 21 October 1988, 391 schoolchildren aged 13 to 16 and their teachers boarded Jupiter at the Greek port of Piraeus at the start of a week-long educational cruise around the Mediterranean.

Just 15 minutes after leaving port, the Jupiter was struck by an Italian freight ship, the Adige, that was entering port.

The lives of two passengers (a pupil and a teacher from the West Midlands) and two Greek crew members were lost. Around 70 people sustained injuries.

Aftermath
In the immediate aftermath of the incident, the captain of the Italian ship was detained and Greek and Italian authorities each blamed the other party. The subsequent court cases lasted almost eight years.

The ship remained where she sank,  from the port entrance at Piraeus. A significant oil leakage occurred in 1999, possibly following disturbance of the seabed by an earthquake, and was removed in a 43-day operation to protect the local marine environment.

An Institute of Psychiatry report in 1999 focused on the experiences of the children and formed one of the largest studies of adolescent survivors of disasters when it was published.

The impact on the young people was also recorded in a book called Jupiter's Children, compiled by former schoolteacher and Jupiter survivor Mary Campion and published in 1998. Given the gravity of the incident, it was considered remarkable that all but one schoolchild survived, but in an interview in The Independent, Mary Campion suggested that their behaviour may have been a contributory factor: "Schoolchildren are accustomed to obeying orders and those aboard did so without argument. They are used to being in a crowd, being controlled by adults, without questioning at the time, and to moving frequently in a school day in large numbers without pushing, jostling or hurting each other."

Writing in the newsletter of the group Disaster Action in 2010, Campion said that although the case had set a number of legal precedents in UK law and had changed safety regulations for passengers on ships, many of the survivors were suffering from post-traumatic stress disorder in the aftermath and did not receive the treatment they needed. She added that a Facebook page for Jupiter Survivors established in 2009 had revealed that many people were still adversely affected two decades on.

Trivia
 The MV Adige was still in service as a car carrier until she was scrapped in 2001.

References

Further reading

External links
 Review of Jupiter's Children at TES
 Disaster Action website

1961 ships
Ships built in France
Passenger ships of Israel
Cruise ships of Greece
Maritime incidents in 1988
Shipwrecks in the Mediterranean Sea